The Democratic Transformation  (Transformación Democrática) is a political party in Ecuador. 
At the last legislative elections, 20 October 2002, the party won 1 out of 100 seats.
Its candidate Jacinto Velázquez Herrera won 3.7% of the vote in the presidential elections of the same day. 

Political parties in Ecuador
Political parties with year of establishment missing